Jussy-le-Chaudrier is a commune in the Cher department in the Centre-Val de Loire region of France.

Geography
The river forms part of the commune's western and northern borders.

Population

Sights
 The church of St. Julien, dating from the sixteenth century.
 A watermill at Bion.
 Bordes chapel and tower, all that remains of a thirteenth-century commandery temple.

See also
Communes of the Cher department

References

Communes of Cher (department)